Esna Boyd and Jack Hawkes successfully defended their title by defeating Youtha Anthony and Jim Willard 6–1, 6–3 in the final, to win the mixed doubles tennis title at the 1927 Australian Championships.

Seeds 

  Esna Boyd /  Jack Hawkes (champions)
  Youtha Anthony /  Jim Willard (final)
  Sylvia Harper /  Rupert Wertheim (semifinals)
  Louie Bickerton /  Bob Schlesinger (second round)

Draw

Finals

Earlier rounds

Section 1

Section 2

Notes 

  Original pairing was J. Willard with Daphne Akhurst, but the latter had to withdraw owing to illness.
  Most likely either Nell Webb or Nancy Webb.
  Probably Mrs. W. T. Rowe (Flora Rowe).
 1R Turner/Moon vs. Stephens/Hopman: some sources give 4–6, 6–3, 6–4.
 2R Anthony/Willard vs. Bellamy/Lamb: some sources give 6–2, 6–1.
 QF Harper/Wertheim vs. Le Messurier/James: some sources give 6–2, 6–4.

References

External links 
 Source for seedings

1927 in Australian tennis
Mixed Doubles